Khunirud (also Romanized as Khūnīrūd and Khavin Rood; also known as Khaynarev, Khoinarev, Khvoīnrūd, and Khvoy Nāreh) is a village in Misheh Pareh Rural District, in the Central District of Kaleybar County, East Azerbaijan Province, Iran. At the 2006 census, its population was 23, in 6 families.

References 

Populated places in Kaleybar County